Henri François Jean André Marchand (28 August 1898, Mainvilliers, Eure-et-Loir, France – 22 May 1959, 15th arrondissement of Paris) known as Henri Marchand — was a French actor of stage and screen.

Filmography

 1927 : Mathusalem ou l'éternel bourgeois (short film by Jean Painlevé)
 1931 : À nous la liberté (Director: René Clair) ... as Émile
 1932 : Amour amour / Pour ses beaux yeux (Director: Robert Bibal) ... as Paul Berton
 1932 : L'enfant du miracle (Director: Maurice Diamant-Berger) ... as Georges
 1932 : Je vous aimerai toujours (Director: Mario Camerini) ... as Pierre Duchesne
 1934 : Volga in Flames de Victor Tourjansky  ...  as Ivan
 1934 : Le Billet de mille de Marc Didier ... as the Manager
 1934 : Le Bossu de René Sti : Passepoil
 1934 : La Marche nuptiale de Mario Bonnard : César
 1934 : Ces messieurs de la noce de Germain Fried (court métrage)
 1934 : Crémaillère de Georges Root (court métrage)
 1934 : L'École des resquilleurs de Germain Fried (court métrage)
 1935 : Madame Angot's Daughter de Jean Bernard-Derosne : Antonin
 1935 : La Tendre Ennemie de Max Ophüls : l'extra
 1935 : L'Enfant du Danube de Charles le Derle et André Alexandre: a sailor
 1935 : Bébé est un amour de M. Rugard (court métrage)
 1936 : Monsieur Personne de Christian-Jaque : Germain
 1936 : Match nul de Maurice Gleize (moyen métrage)
 1937 : Les Deux Combinards de Jacques Houssin : Cormoz
 1939 : Musicians of the Sky de Georges Lacombe 
 1939 : Thunder Over Paris de Bernard Deschamps : le badeau bègue
 1949 : La Souricière d'Henri Calef : un juré
 1950 : Under the Sky of Paris de Julien Duvivier : un journaliste
 1950 : Trois Télégrammes d'Henri Decoin : Joseph, le concierge de l'école
 1951 : Clara de Montargis d'Henri Decoin
 1951 : Ils sont dans les vignes de Robert Vernay : le copain
 1951 : La Plus Belle Fille du monde de Christian Stengel : le maire
 1952 : L'amour n'est pas un péché de Claude Cariven 
 1952 : Les Belles de nuit de René Clair : l'abbé en 1789
 1952 :  d'Henri Verneuil (dans le sketch Le Témoignage d'un enfant de chœur)
 1952 : Operation Magali de 
 1953 : L'Amour d'une femme de Jean Grémillon 
 1953 : Jeunes Mariés, de Gilles Grangier : le curé (non crédité)
 1956 : Les Aventures de Till L'Espiègle de Gérard Philipe et Joris Ivens : le prêtre
 1957 :  (Le Tombeur) by René Delacroix 
 1958 : Pourquoi viens-tu si tard? by Henri Decoin

Theater 
 1945 : A Flea in Her Ear by Georges Feydeau, mise en scène Robert Ancelin, Théâtre de la Porte-Saint-Martin
 1949 : Le Roi by Robert de Flers and Gaston Arman de Caillavet, mise en scène Jacques Charon, Comédie-Française  
 1950 : La Belle Aventure by Gaston Arman de Caillavet, Robert de Flers and Étienne Rey, mise en scène Jean Debucourt, Comédie-Française
 1950 : A Winter Tale by William Shakespeare, mise en scène Julien Bertheau, Comédie-Française
 1951 : Madame Sans-Gêne by Victorien Sardou, mise en scène Georges Chamarat, Comédie-Française
 1952 : Lorenzaccio by Alfred de Musset, mise en scène Gérard Philipe, TNP Festival d'Avignon

References

External links 
 

1898 births
1959 deaths
People from Eure-et-Loir
French male film actors
French male stage actors
20th-century French male actors